Devers may refer to:

People
 Amy Devers (born 1971), American furniture designer
 Claire Devers (born 1955), French film director and screenwriter
 Gail Devers (born 1966), American track and field athlete
 Gilles Devers (born 1956), French lawyer and academic
 Jacob L. Devers (1887–1979), American general
 Marcos Devers (born 1950), American politician
 Rafael Devers (born 1996), Dominican baseball player

Places
 Devers, Texas, United States